is a bright sub-kilometer asteroid and binary system, classified as near-Earth object and potentially hazardous asteroid of the Apollo group, approximately  in diameter. It was discovered on 30 January 2004 by astronomers of the Lincoln Near-Earth Asteroid Research at Lincoln Laboratory's Experimental Test Site near Socorro, New Mexico. Its  moon was discovered during the asteroid's close approach to the Earth in January 2015.

2015 Earth approach 

On 26 January 2015 at 16:20 UTC,  passed , or 3.1 lunar distances, from Earth. The asteroid briefly peaked around apparent magnitude 9 and was near the celestial equator. Near closest approach the asteroid was moving about 2.5 degrees per hour (2.5 arcseconds per second). The asteroid came to opposition (furthest elongation in the sky from the Sun) on 27 January 2015 at 04:37 UTC. Around 5:00 UTC, the asteroid was near M44 (the Beehive Cluster).

Satellite 

A minor-planet moon, provisionally designated , was first detected by ground-based telescopes by Joe Pollock and Petr Pravec. The secondary is estimated to orbit at least  from the primary.

Numbering and naming 
This minor planet was numbered on 27 March 2013. As of 2020, it has not been named.

Gallery

Notes

References

External links 

 Asteroids with Satellites, Robert Johnston, johnstonsarchive.net
 PSI Scientists Study Surface Composition of Asteroid 2004 BL86 During Close Flyby of Earth, Planetary Science Institute, 27 January 2015
 Asteroid Lightcurve Database (LCDB), query form (info )
 
 
 

357439
357439
357439
357439
357439
357439
20150126
20040130